Oliver Wendell Douglas was the main character in the 1960s CBS situation comedy Green Acres. Portrayed by Hollywood veteran Eddie Albert, Oliver Wendell Douglas was a New York City attorney acting out his long-harbored dream of moving to the Midwest and operating a farm rather than practicing "big city" law. In addition to appearing on Green Acres, the character also made several cross-over appearances on the in-universe show Petticoat Junction.

Character biography 
Oliver Wendell Douglas was a New York City attorney who had long harbored a dream of moving to the Midwest and operating a farm rather than practicing "big city" law. His wife, Lisa, a glamorous Hungarian immigrant (played by Eva Gabor), had absolutely no desire to leave sophisticated New York City for a backward, rural area.  His idea was also met with resistance from his mother, Eunice (Eleanor Audley), who sided with Lisa against leaving New York City for the hinterlands.

However, once they actually arrived at their newly purchased farm (a run-down nightmare whose farmhouse was little more than a dilapidated shack), it was Lisa who immediately fit into Hooterville and its weird collection of zany characters, not Oliver. Instead, he was usually presented as the only sane character in an insane world. Oliver simply doesn't fit into a place where everyone took for granted that a "talking" pig, Arnold Ziffel, was his owners' "son"; where one of the two housing contractor "brothers" was a woman; where the farmhand he hired, young Eb Dawson, would refer to him and Lisa as his "parents"; and where local confidence man Mr. Haney, from whom he had bought the farm, was always getting the upper hand. Of course, Oliver had quirks as well, such as driving his tractor wearing the same three-piece suits that he had formerly worn to practice law. He also addressing nearly everyone in Hooterville as Mr. or Mrs., even though the residents used a first-name basis (although they reciprocated by referring to Oliver as "Mr. Douglas").

Oliver had a high opinion of farmers, and often made speeches in which he referred to "crops shooting up out of the ground" (Lisa, in her Hungarian accent, would repeat the sentiment as "crops shoosting out of the ground"). During these speeches on the idealistic nature of rural life, patriotic music (Yankee Doodle to be exact) would often play; other characters frequently searched for the source of the music. He is such a fanatic farmer wannabe in the pilot episode that during a flashback while on a bombing mission in a P-38, he annoys his squadron commander with comments about how tomatoes are turned into ketchup.  A later episode shows Oliver was a Captain in USAF Reserves when the Hooterville townsfolk try to have him fly a broken down Curtiss JN-4 from World War I.

Despite Oliver's love of farming, he was either too blinded by pride or too stubborn to admit that he was totally incompetent as a farmer. His denial led him to labor on in vain, year after year, when it was obvious to everyone else that he would be far more successful back in his New York law practice. Although he was a horrible farmer and once only made $16 dollars of profit for the entire year, the Douglases never had to worry about money. for example, they never had trouble replacing the numerous dishes that Lisa would break. This once caused the other residents to believe that Oliver was making and selling alcohol, and that he was involved with the mob.

The show featured numerous running gags, such as Oliver usually "losing" in one way or another to the Hooterville yokels. In one episode Mr. Haney, Lisa, and Hank Kimball think they've discovered a "Milk-making" Machine. Oliver has to tell them (tongue-in-cheek) that not only are the chemicals so expensive that milk prices would soar, but that one of the ingredients in this new milk also causes temporary baldness! Another episode shows Oliver as a "successful" lawyer when he manages to convince the US Army not to draft Arnold Ziffel the Pig. At the end of the episode, Oliver has a new client to keep from being drafted – "Ralph Monroe"! Another running gag in later seasons of the show involved Oliver often being unable to finish something he starts to say due to being rudely interrupted by other characters.

Character creation 
In the 1950 radio sitcom on which Green Acres was originally based, the character was a banker named John Granby and portrayed by Gale Gordon. Granby, in turn, was based on Gordon's character on My Favorite Husband. In a notable difference between the radio and television versions, Granby had a teenage daughter, which the Douglases did not. The character's basic premise of a white-collar city man with a passion for farming but no talent for it remained unchanged.

The character's name was inspired by famed Supreme Court justice Oliver Wendell Holmes and possibly also by then-Supreme Court justice William Orville Douglas.

See also 
 Hooterville

References 

Green Acres characters
Fictional American lawyers
Fictional farmers
Fictional characters from New York City
Petticoat Junction characters
Television characters introduced in 1965